William Lacy Brown (July 16, 1913 – March 8, 1991) was an American geneticist notable for breeding programs in maize, sorghum, soybeans and wheat.
He was president, chairman and chief executive of Pioneer Hi-Bred International. He was also a director of the Rockefeller Foundation's advisory committee on maize. Brown was elected to the National Academies of Science. The National Academies Press said that Brown "made significant and lasting contributions to increasing and stabilizing food production worldwide".

Career and life
Brown received his Ph.D. from Washington University in 1941. For almost his entire career of 40 years, he was with Pioneer Hi-Bred International, one of the world's largest manufacturers of hybrid seed corn.

Awards and distinctions
 Fellow, American Society of Agronomy, 1970
 Fellow, Iowa Academy of Science, 1970
 Fellow, Drake University, 1970 
 Agronomic Service Award, American Society of Agronomy, 1979 
 Distinguished Fellow, Iowa Academy of Science, 1980 
 Distinguished Alumni Award, Bridgewater College, 1980 
 Member, National Academy of Sciences, 1980
 Honorary Phi Beta Kappa, Drake University, 1981 
 President, Crop Science Society of America, 1982
 Distinguished Economic Botanist, Society for Economic Botany, 1982
 Distinguished Alumni Award, Washington University, 1983
 Genetics and Plant Breeding Award for Industry, Crop Science Society of America, 1986 
 Henry Shaw Medal, Missouri Botanical Garden, 1986 
 Honorary D.Sc., Drake University, 1987 
 Fellow, American Association for the Advancement of Science, 1989 
 Honorary Ph.D., West Virginia University, 1989

References

External links
National Academy of Sciences Biographical Memoir

1913 births
1991 deaths
American geneticists
Members of the United States National Academy of Sciences
Washington University in St. Louis alumni